Homo homini lupus is a Latin phrase meaning "man is a wolf to another man".

Homo homini lupus may also refer to:

Homo homini lupus (album), by Locanda delle Fate (2009)
"Homo Homini Lupis", an episode from the first season of Law & Order: Criminal Intent